Chipaya (endolinguonym Chipay taqu) is a native South American language of the Uru–Chipaya language family. The only other language in the grouping, Uru, is considered by some to be a divergent dialect of Chipaya. Chipaya has been influenced considerably by Aymara, the Quechuan languages, and more recently, Spanish, with a third of its vocabulary having been replaced by those languages. 

The Chipayan language is spoken in the area south of Lake Titicaca along the Desaguadero River in the mountains of Bolivia and mainly in the town of Chipaya located in the Sabaya Province of the Bolivian department of Oruro north of Coipasa Salt Flats.  Native speakers generally refer to it as Chipay taqu or Puquina or Uchun Maa Taqu ("our mother language"), but is not the same as, nor in fact even related to, the extinct Puquina language. Chipaya is an agglutinative language, though it has features uncommon to most agglutinative languages, according to preliminary research by the organization DOBES.

Phonology

Consonants

Consonant clusters
Multiple possibilities are separated by slashes, and optional elements are enclosed in parentheses.

Possible syllable onsets are:
(s/š) + p + (h)
(s/š/sh) + k/q + (h/hʷ/x/xʷ)
s/š + p/k/kʷ/q/qʷ/h/hʷ/m/n
t + h/hʷ/x/xʷ
¢/č/ch/l + h

Possible syllable codas are:
h/x + p/t/k/q/l/lʲ/r + (t)
hʷ/xʷ + k/q + (t)
Consonant + t

Vowels
Vowels have continental values for a, e , i , o, and u .

References

External links
DOBES - Chipaya Language
DOBES - Uru-Chipaya
Lilian Porterie Etudes, Audios and Transcriptions of the Chipaya Language
Chipaya (Intercontinental Dictionary Series)

Indigenous languages of the Andes
Languages of Bolivia
Uru–Chipaya languages